Doctor Clayton Forrester may refer to:

Doctor Clayton Forrester (War of the Worlds), lead character from the 1953 film War of the Worlds
Dr. Clayton Forrester (Mystery Science Theater 3000), mad scientist from the television show Mystery Science Theater 3000